The communauté de communes du Cœur de France was created on December 14, 1999 and is located in the Cher  département  of the Centre-Val de Loire  region of France. In 2013 it absorbed 6 of the communes of the former Communauté de communes du Berry charentonnais. It seat is the town Saint-Amand-Montrond. Its area is 379.1 km2, and its population was 18,315 in 2018.

Composition
The communauté de communes consists of the following 19 communes:

Arpheuilles
Bessais-le-Fromental
Bouzais
Bruère-Allichamps
La Celle
Charenton-du-Cher
Colombiers
Coust
Drevant
Farges-Allichamps
La Groutte
Marçais
Meillant
Nozières
Orcenais
Orval
Saint-Amand-Montrond
Saint-Pierre-les-Étieux
Vernais

References

Coeur de France
Coeur de France